Priani is a surname. Notable people with the surname include:

Ernesto Priani (born 1962), Mexican philosopher, professor, digital humanist, digital editor
Horacio Priani (1912-1964), Argentine film actor
Pedro Luis Priani, 1962-63 Federal Interventor of the Chubut province, Argentina

See also 
Prion (disambiguation)